Ira Dubey is an Indian actress who has appeared on TV, in theatre and in Bollywood films.


Biography
Dubey was born in Delhi, India, to former senior vice-president of corporate communications in the Tata Group, Ravi Dubey and Lillete Dubey, an actress. She has one sister, Neha.
 
Actively involved in performance since the age of six, Dubey has had a prolific career in both film and theater. At Yale, she trained in speech and movement development, Shakespeare, Meisner and the Michael Chekhov acting technique along with other acting theories. She performed in over ten productions there, including A Midsummer Night's Dream, Othello, The House of Bernarda Alba and Beckett's shorts.

Dubey's theatrical work in India includes Womanly Voices, 30 Days in September, Wedding Album, Adhe Adhure and August: Osage County with the Primetime Theatre Company; The President Is Coming  with QTP productions and The Maids with the Industrial Theatre Company. Since September 2014 she has been performing and touring with the internationally acclaimed one woman show, Heather Raffo's 9 Parts of Desire, directed by Lillete Dubey, which has been hugely appreciated by audiences and critics alike across India and South Africa. She appeared in Tennessee Williams' Glass Menagerie, directed by Rajit Kapur, and played Portia in Vickram Kapadia's production of William Shakespeare's Merchant of Venice.  She played Nora in Pushan Kripalani's production of Henrik Ibsen's A Doll's House, which opened 6 October 2016 in Mumbai. 
 
Her film credits include Marigold, directed by Willard Caroll (2005) and The President is Coming (2009) produced by Rohan Sippy and directed by Kunal Roy Kapoor.

Her most high-profile role to-date came with Aisha (2010), the ensemble romantic comedy-drama directed by Rajshree Ojha, in which she starred alongside Sonam Kapoor, Abhay Deol, Cyrus Sahukar, Amrita Puri, Anand Tiwari, Arunoday Singh and Lisa Haydon; she portrayed Pinky Bose, the best-friend of Kapoor's eponymous lead.

She also featured in Graveyard Shift, an independent film written and directed by Ahmed Fiyaz; M Cream, an English film written and directed by Agneya Singh, produced by Agniputra Films and co-starring Barry John, Tom Alter, Lushin Dubey, and Imaad Shah (winner, Best Feature Film, Rhode Island International Film Festival); Dilliwali Zaalim Girlfriend, written by Manu Rishi Chadda, directed by Dubai-based Japinder Baweja (released in March 2015); and Best Actress ward at the third Indian Cine International Film Festival.

She has been a film critic on television for Sony Pix for a weekly show called Chicks on Flicks for a total of 108 episodes. She has starred in advertisements for Olay, Blackberry, Airtel, Bluestone Jewellery and Myntra. She spent the summer of 2014 training at the Stella Adler Studio of Acting in New York in the Chekhov Intensive Workshop, and trained at Adishakti in the autumn of 2015 in Pondicherry, India. She recently finished shooting Mahesh Dattani's 30 days in September, a poignant story about child sexual abuse in which she plays the lead, for Zee TV, one of India's largest and most popular television networks.

In 2016, in addition to playing Nora in A Doll's House, she completed shooting for two feature films, Dharma & Red Chillies Productions' Dear Zindagi, directed by Gauri Shinde and starring Alia Bhatt and Shah Rukh Khan and an independent feature film, Shehjar, directed by Nikhil Allug, in which she plays the lead.

She currently hosts a show for Zee TV called A Table for Two.

Filmography
 Marigold (2007)
 The President Is Coming (2009) as Archana Kapoor
 Aisha (2010) as Pinky Bose
 Turning 30 (2011) as Yamini Punjwani
 M Cream (2012) as Jay
 Dilliwali Zaalim Girlfriend (2015) as Nimmy
 Aisa Yeh Jahaan (2015) as Ananya Saikia
 Dear Zindagi (2016) as Fatima/Fatty
 Shehjar (2017) as Mariyam

Web series

References

External links 

 

Indian film actresses
Indian stage actresses
Living people
Year of birth missing (living people)
Actresses in Hindi cinema
21st-century Indian actresses